Notagonum lawsoni is a species of ground beetle in the subfamily Platyninae. It is endemic to New Zealand. It was described by Bates in 1874. Notagonum lawsoni has been collected from Metrosideros excelsa through the beating of foliage.

References

Notagonum
Beetles described in 1874
Beetles of New Zealand
Endemic fauna of New Zealand
Endemic insects of New Zealand